Miguel Coronado (born February 6, 1987) is a Chilean footballer. He began his career in the youth system of Universidad de Chile before making his debut in the 2007 Apertura tournament.

Honours

Club
Universidad de Chile
Primera División de Chile (1): 2009 Apertura

External links
 BDFA profile

1989 births
Living people
Chilean footballers
Universidad de Chile footballers
Unión La Calera footballers
Association football wingers
People from Santiago Province, Chile